A List of senators of Nièvre, France, follows. These individuals have represented the Nièvre department of France in the French Senate.

Third republic 

Senators for Nièvre under the French Third Republic were:

Fourth republic 

Senators for Nièvre under the French Fourth Republic were:

 Jacques Gadoin (1946–1959) Miscellaneous left (DVG)
 Jean Doussot (1948–1959 Rally of the French People (RPF)

Fifth republic 

Senators for Nièvre under the French Fifth Republic:

References

Sources

 
Nievre